Utoh may refer to:

Tracie Chima Utoh, Nigerian playwright
Mat Taram bin Sa'al, Indonesian mass-murderer known as Utoh
Eigo Utoh, member of Midas (Japanese band)